Hertrich is a German surname. Notable people with the surname include:

Rainer Hertrich (born 1949), German businessman
Stefan Hertrich (born 1976), German singer and musician

See also
Herdrich

German-language surnames